Signs of Satanic Youth is the debut extended play by Australian rock band Magic Dirt. It was released in November 1993 on the Melbourne-based, independent label Au Go Go Records.

The EP was re-released in January 2019 on CD and 12" vinyl. Upon the re-release, Magic Dirt said "The reissue of Signs of Satanic Youth is particularly significant as it was a project spearheaded by Dean (Turner) and was a long held dream of his that we are now so proud to be able to realise. To have it available to the public after almost 25 years and for the first time on 12" vinyl is a momentous occasion for the band and we are so happy to be able to share this part of our legacy."

The band toured the release across Australia between December 2018 and March 2019.

Background and history
The band's first single, "Super Tear", had been released earlier in 1993, on the then-Sydney label Fellaheen. The band then supported Sonic Youth and Pavement during their 1993 Australian tours. They signed with Au Go Go Records later in that year.

Band member Dean Turner said that the 5 songs on Signs of Satanic Youth "were literally the first 5 songs that the band had".

Founding members of Magic Dirt, vocalist/guitarist Adalita Srsen and bassist Turner were dating during the making of this EP. In early 1994 the band broke up due to the demise of their relationship, only to reform and release their second EP Life was Better in November of that year.

In 2019, Adalita recalled "...It's funny but I have such strong memories of putting together the artwork. We all gathered around at Daniel's house, an old weatherboard shack in the marshlands at the back of Geelong. We spent hours and hours assembling all the bits and pieces and drawing and sketching and deliberating and fine tuning. That's how we were, passionate and attentive to every little detail, everything had meaning, everything had to be right, from cutting out those little paper horns to Dean's drawing of the piranha like fish. Being our first EP we were pretty damn excited as you can imagine."

Reception

In 2019, Jeff Jenkins from Stack Magazine said the EP "was an uncompromising mix of blazing guitars and attitude." He said "Twenty-five years after it was released, Signs of Satanic Youth still burns with a raging intensity, and it's a blistering reminder of the glory days of the early '90s when the alternative became the mainstream.".

Track listing
 CDEP

 Double 7"

 12"

Release history

References

1993 EPs
Magic Dirt albums
Au Go Go Records EPs
Indie pop EPs
EPs by Australian artists